Makuleke Dam is an earth-fill type dam located on the Mphongolo River, a tributary of the Shingwedzi River. It is located near Giyani, Limpopo, South Africa. The dam was established in 1990 and serves mainly for irrigation purposes. The hazard potential of the dam has been ranked significant (2).

See also
List of reservoirs and dams in South Africa
List of rivers of South Africa

References 

 List of South African Dams from the Department of Water Affairs and Forestry (South Africa)

Dams in South Africa
Dams completed in 1990